Ross Edgar (born 3 January 1983) is a Scottish track cyclist who represented Scotland at the 2002 and 2006 Commonwealth Games, where he won a gold medal in the team sprint riding with Chris Hoy and Craig MacLean. He competed for Great Britain at the 2004 and 2008 Olympic Games

He won a silver medal at the 2007 UCI Track World Championships in the team sprint and a bronze medal in the Keirin.

He won a silver medal at the 2008 Beijing Olympics.

In London 2012 Olympics, Edgar who was to represent Great Britain in the Team Sprint final was replaced & missed out on a Gold Medal which the team won.

Representing Scotland internationally he was Born in Newmarket, Suffolk. Having qualified to represent Scotland through his father David.

Ross Edgar as an amateur youth rider started with West Suffolk Wheelers based in Bury St Edmunds, Suffolk alongside younger brother Bruce.

In December 2012 it was announced that Edgar had signed for the IG-Sigma Sport cycling team for the 2013 season, adding road racing commitments to his existing membership of the Great Britain track cycling programme. After the team withdrew from racing at the end of the season Edgar was confirmed as s member of the Great Britain Olympic Podium Programme, switching from the sprint to the endurance squad.

Pre 2018, Edgar was a UCI coach based in Aigle, Switzerland, where he also coached Korean cyclist Lee Hye-Jin, who finished 8th in the keirin at the 2016 Rio Olympics.

Currently he is a track sprint coach for Cycling Australia, based in Adelaide.

Results

2012
Track Cycling World Cup
3rd Team sprint, Round 4, London (with Chris Hoy and Jason Kenny)
2010
British National Team Sprint Championships
 Gold
World Track Championships, Copenhagen
 Bronze, Team Sprint
2009
Track Cycling World Cup Classics
1st Team sprint, Round 1, Manchester
2008
Olympics
 Silver, Men's Keirin
World Track Championships, Manchester
 Silver, Team Sprint
Track Cycling World Cup Classics
1st Team sprint (with Jason Kenny and Jamie Staff), Round 1, Manchester
2nd Manchester International Keirin
2007
World Track Championships, Majorca
 Silver, Team Sprint
 Bronze, Men's Keirin
Track Cycling World Cup Classics
2nd Keirin, Round 3, Los Angeles
3rd Sprint, Round 3, Los Angeles
3rd Team sprint, Round 3, Los Angeles (with Jason Kenny and Jason Queally)
1st Team sprint, Round 4, Manchester (with Chris Hoy and Craig MacLean)
2nd Sprint, Round 1, Sydney
3rd Manchester International Keirin
British National Track Championships
1st Sprint
2006
Commonwealth Games, Melbourne
 Gold, Team Sprint (Scotland)
 Silver, Men's Sprint
 Bronze, Men's Keirin
Track Cycling World Cup Classics
1st Team sprint, Round 1, Sydney (with Chris Hoy and Craig MacLean)
2nd Sprint, Round 1, Sydney
British National Track Championships
1st Keirin
2nd Sprint
2nd Team sprint (with Matt Crampton and Jamie Staff)
2005
European Track Championships (under-23)
 Silver, Sprint
Track Cycling World Cup Classics
1st Team sprint, Round 2, Manchester (with Chris Hoy and Craig MacLean)
2004
European Track Championships (under-23)
 Gold, Sprint
British National Track Championships
1st Sprint
1st Team sprint (with David Heald and Barney Storey)
2003
Track Cycling World Cup Classics
3rd Sprint, Round 4, Sydney
British National Track Championships
1st Sprint
2002
Commonwealth Games, Manchester
 Bronze, Team Sprint (Scotland)

References

External links 
 Team GB Rider Profile

Scottish male cyclists
Cyclists at the 2002 Commonwealth Games
Cyclists at the 2006 Commonwealth Games
Commonwealth Games gold medallists for Scotland
Cyclists at the 2004 Summer Olympics
Cyclists at the 2008 Summer Olympics
Olympic cyclists of Great Britain
Olympic silver medallists for Great Britain
People from Newmarket, Suffolk
1983 births
Living people
Olympic medalists in cycling
Scottish Olympic medallists
Cyclists at the 2010 Commonwealth Games
Medalists at the 2008 Summer Olympics
Commonwealth Games silver medallists for Scotland
Commonwealth Games bronze medallists for Scotland
Commonwealth Games medallists in cycling
Scottish cycling coaches
English people of Scottish descent
Sportspeople from Suffolk
British expatriate sportspeople in Switzerland
British expatriate sportspeople in Australia
Medallists at the 2002 Commonwealth Games
Medallists at the 2006 Commonwealth Games